Frederick IV, Elector Palatine of the Rhine (5 March 1574 – 19 September 1610), only surviving son of Louis VI, Elector Palatine and Elisabeth of Hesse, called "Frederick the Righteous" (French: Frédéric IV le juste).

Life
Born in Amberg, his father died in October 1583 and Frederick came under the guardianship of his uncle, John Casimir, an ardent Calvinist.  The Calvinist mathematician and astronomer Bartholemaeus Pitiscus served as Frederick's tutor and later became court preacher. 

In January 1592, Frederick assumed control of the government of the Electorate of the Palatinate upon the death of John Casimir.  Frederick continued John Casimir's anti-Catholic measures and in 1608 became the head of the Protestant military alliance known as the Protestant Union. He soon fell prey to alcoholism, leaving state matters largely to his chief minister Christian of Anhalt. Frederick IV died in 1610 in Heidelberg.

Family and children
In 1593 he married Louise Juliana of Nassau, the daughter of William I of Orange and Charlotte de Bourbon-Monpensier. They had eight children:
 Luise Juliane of the Palatinate (Heidelberg, 16 July 1594 - Meisenheim, 28 April 1640); married in 1612 to Pfalzgraf John II, Count Palatine of Zweibrücken.
 Katharina Sofie of the Palatinate (Heidelberg, 10 June 1595 - Köln an der Spree, 28 June 1626).
 Frederick V, Elector Palatine (Jagdschloß Deinschwang, 16 August 1596 - Mainz, 29 November 1632); married in 1713 Elizabeth Stuart, Queen of Bohemia.
 Elisabeth Charlotte of the Palatinate (Neumarkt, 19 November 1597 - Crossen an der Oder, 26 April 1660); married in 1616 to Elector George William of Brandenburg.
 Anna Eleonore of the Palatinate (Heidelberg, 4 January 1599 - Heidelberg, 10 October 1600).
 Louis William of the Palatinate (Heidelberg, 5 August 1600 - Heidelberg, 10 October 1600).
 Maurice Christian of the Palatinate (Heidelberg, 18 September 1601 - Heidelberg, 28 March 1605).
 Louis Philip, Count Palatine of Simmern-Kaiserslautern (Heidelberg, 23 November 1602 - Krossen, 6 January 1655).

Ancestors

Notes

References
Parker, Geoffrey (ed.) (1997): The Thirty Years' War: Second Edition. Routledge.

1574 births
1610 deaths
People from Amberg
House of Wittelsbach
Modern child monarchs
Prince-electors of the Palatinate
German Calvinist and Reformed Christians
Burials at the Church of the Holy Spirit, Heidelberg